Artanes Bay (‘Zaliv Artanes’ \'za-liv 'ar-ta-nes\) is the 14 km wide cove indenting for 6.2 km Oscar II Coast in Graham Land, Antarctica, and entered west of Cape Fairweather and east of Shiver Point.  It was formed as a result of the break-up of Larsen Ice Shelf in the area in 2002, and subsequent retreat of Rogosh Glacier.

The feature is named after the ancient settlement of Artanes in northwestern Bulgaria.

Location
SCAR Antarctic Digital Database mapping in 2012.

Maps
 Antarctic Digital Database (ADD). Scale 1:250000 topographic map of Antarctica. Scientific Committee on Antarctic Research (SCAR). Since 1993, regularly upgraded and updated.

References
 Artanes Bay. SCAR Composite Antarctic Gazetteer.
 Bulgarian Antarctic Gazetteer. Antarctic Place-names Commission. (details in Bulgarian, basic data in English)

External links
 Artanes Bay. Copernix satellite image

Bays of Graham Land
Oscar II Coast
Bulgaria and the Antarctic